The WATC Derby, also known as the Western Australia Derby is a Perth Racing Group 2 Thoroughbred horse race for three-year-olds, at set weights, over a distance of 2400 metres at Ascot Racecourse in Perth, Western Australia in April. Total prizemoney is $400,000.

History
The inaugural running of the race was on 2 January 1888 as the first race on the second day of WATC Summer Meeting which was highlighted by The Queen's Plate. The race was called the West Australia Derby, with prizemoney  of 100 sovereigns with an additional sweep of 2 sovereigns for the second place horse. Colonial bred horses were allowed 5 pounds allowance. The filly, Harridan started as the even money favourite and won by 2 lengths.

The race continued to be part of the WATC Summer Carnival until 1988 when it was moved to April. The club reverted to the summer schedule in 1993 but by 2002 the race was again being held in April.

1953 racebook

Grade

1888–1978 -  Principal Race
1979–1991 -  Group 1
1992–1993 -  Group 2
1994–2011 -  Group 1
 2012 onwards -  Group 2

Venue
 In 2005 the race was run at Belmont Park Racecourse.

Winners

2022 - Alaskan God
2021 - Western Empire
2020 - Tuscan Queen
2019 - Regal Power
2018 - Action
2017 - Gatting
2016 - Arcadia Dream
2015 - Delicacy
 2014 - Respondent
 2013 - Mystic Prince
 2012 - Rohan
 2011 - Dreamaway
 2010 - Chartreux
 2009 - Markus Maximus
 2008 - Grand Journey
 2007 - Guyno
 2006 - Cats Fun
 2005 - Plastered
 2004 - Mr Sandgroper
 2003 - Shirazamatazz
 2002 - Honor Lap
 2001 - ¶race not held
 2000 - Old Money
 1999 - Voile D'Or
 1998 - Kim Angel
 1997 - Hot Jules
 1996 - Capricious Lass
 1995 - Crying Game
 1994 - Beaux Art
 ♯1993 (Dec) - Beaujolais Boy
 1993 (May) - Firing Range
 1992 - Heroicity
 1991 - Mirror Magic
 1990 - Chipolata
 1989 - Belele
 1988 - The Bukhra
 1987 - ¶race not held
 1986 - Joindre
 1985 - Rant And Rave
 1984 - National Gallery
 1983 - Old Currency
 1982 - Rare Flyer
 1981 - Vortilla
 1980 - Seltrice
 1979 - Mighty Kingdom
 1978 - Regimental Honour
 1977 - Stormy Rex
 1976 - Chasta Bellota
 1975 - Ngawyni
 1974 - Bottled Sunshine
 1973 - Asgard
 1972 - Dayana
 1971 - Ride Easy
 1970 - Chez Felix
 1969 - Surrender
 1968 - Hidalios
 1967 - Sir Chatary
 1966 - Redacre
 1965 - Baccare
 1964 - Kev's Folly
 1963 - Gojon
 1962 - Nicopolis
 1961 - Magic Colour
 1960 - Chestillion
 1959 - Little Empire
 1958 - England's Dust
 1957 - Nhargo
 1956 - Lady Orator
 1955 - Mallant
 1954 - Asterios
 1953 - Just Peter
 1952 - Raconteur
 1951 - Smart Chief
 1950 - Jovial Lad
 1949 - Prediction
 1948 - Precedent
 1947 - Westralian
 1946 - Lady Lucia
 1945 - Cherbourg
 1944 - Lord Treat
 1943 - Kalamunda
 1942 - Pantheist
 1941 - Kimra
 1940 - Hestia
 1939 - True Flight
 1938 - Gay Prince
 1937 - Footmark
 1936 - Oceanus
 1935 - Yaringa
 1934 - Hyperion
 1933 - Panto
 1932 - Olympian
 1931 - Isle Of Astur
 1930 - Beaunilly, owned by Amelia Bunbury
 1929 - Ozonia
 1928 - Second Wind
 1927 - Hint
 1926 - Maple
 1925 - Sir Alwyne
 1924 - Huette
 1923 - Lilypond
 1922 - Killiecrankie
 1921 - Easingwold
 1920 - Fluent
 1919 - Eurythmic
 1918 - Oyadu
 1917 - Green Lord
 1916 - Yandil
 1915 - Pillotos
 1914 - Mistico
 1913 - Radnor
 1912 - Dueler
 1911 - Ayrville
 1910 - Renegade
 1909 - Jolly Beggar
 1908 - Thorina
 1907 - Post Town
 1906 - Benbow
 1905 - Piata
 1904 - Keston
 1903 - Bandolier
 1902 - Honeydew
 1901 - Trionia
 1900 - Warrior II
 1899 - †Ormuz / Wairiri
 1898 - Tarquin
 1897 - Le Var
 1896 - Inverary
 1895 - Florrie
 1894 - ¤Carbine
 1893 - Scarpia
 1892 - Karratha
 1891 - ‡The Crash
 1890 - St. Ives
 1889 - Aim
 1888 - Harridan

♯ The race was run twice in 1993 when the WATC restored the running to the original date prior to New Year's Day for the 1993–94 racing season.
¶ Race moved in the 1987–88 racing calendar forward and run in the autumn of 1988.
The race was once again moved from the traditional summer Christmas/New Year's Day Carnival forward to the autumn of 2002.
† Race was run twice in 1899. Ormuz won on New Year's Day in 1899. The next racing season (1899-1900) the race was held on 30 December 1899.
¤ Not to be confused with the great Carbine from the same era. The 1894 winner, Carbine's ((AUS) H, 1890) breeding was Termando — Trishna. 
‡ Won the race on walkover. The owner promptly entered The Crash in the prestigious (at the time) Queen's Plate over a distance of 3 miles where The Crash finished in fourth place.

See also

 List of Australian Group races
 Group races

References

Horse races in Australia
Flat horse races for three-year-olds
Sport in Perth, Western Australia